The Aoke-Langalanga by-election, 2008 was a by-election for the Aoke-Langalanga constituency in the National Parliament of Solomon Islands. It was held following the death of sitting MP (and former Prime Minister) Bartholomew Ulufa'alu, of the Liberal Party.

Ten candidates (nine men and one woman) stood for the by-election, which was held on March 28, 2008.

Matthew Cooper Wale, of the Democratic Party, obtained 1,608 votes, while Billy Manu, in second place, "polled a little over 1000 ballots". Voter turn-out was about 70%.

Results

See also
 List of Solomon Islands by-elections

References

2008
2008 in the Solomon Islands
Solomon Islands